Fujiwara no Chikako (藤原親子 dates unknown) was a waka poet and Japanese noblewoman active in the Kamakura period.

External links 
E-text of her poems in Japanese

Japanese poets
Japanese ladies-in-waiting
Fujiwara clan

Japanese women writers
13th-century Japanese women